Michael Smith Harvey (February 9, 1881 – June 3, 1958) was an American football player and coach.  He served as the head football coach at the University of Alabama in 1901, at Auburn University in 1902, and at the University of Mississippi (Ole Miss) from 1903 to 1904, and compiling a career college football record of 8–7–3.  In 1900, Harvey played tackle at Auburn.

Head coaching record

Notes

References

External links
 

1881 births
1958 deaths
American football tackles
Alabama Crimson Tide football coaches
Auburn Tigers football coaches
Auburn Tigers football players
Ole Miss Rebels football coaches
People from Russell County, Alabama
Coaches of American football from Alabama
Players of American football from Alabama